Ronald Cumming (4 April 1900 – 17 November 1982) was a Scotland international rugby union player.

Rugby Union career

Amateur career

Cumming played for Aberdeen University.

Provincial career

He played for North of Scotland District.

International career

He played for Scotland twice in 1922.

Business career

He followed into the family business in the whisky industry. He became Chairman of the Scottish Whisky Association in 1961. He became Chairman of Distillers Company Ltd. in 1963.

Family

His parents were John Fleetwood Cumming (1863-1933) and Beatrice Gordon Bryson Kynoch (1865-1906). John Fleetwood Cumming was a Moray councillor and owner of the Cardhu distillery near Knockando, which was founded by his grandfather in 1824. They had 2 sons Lewis Robertson Cumming (1892-1914), John Kynoch Cumming (1896-1927) and 1 daughter Elizabeth Cumming (1898-1989) as well as Ronald. His father remarried Isobel Field when Beatrice died, they had a daughter in 1909 that died in infancy. Lewis joined the Black Watch and died in the Great War; John was wounded and taken prisoner.

Ronald married Mary Hendrie (1904-1990) in Wentworth, Ontario in Canada in 1925. They had 2 daughters Elizabeth Bryson Cumming (1926-2015) and Mary Stuart Cumming (1929-1990). Mary Hendrie received an O.B.E. in 1953.

References

1900 births
1982 deaths
Aberdeen University RFC players
North of Scotland (standalone) players
Rugby union players from Aberlour
Scotland international rugby union players
Scottish rugby union players
Rugby union props